The Switzerland national women's field hockey team represents Switzerland in international field hockey tournaments for women. They generally compete in the lowest tier of the European championships, the Women's EuroHockey Championship III and have never qualified for the Olympics.

Tournament record

World Cup
1974 – 9th place
1976 – 8th place

EuroHockey Championship II
2011 – 7th place

EuroHockey Championship III
2005 – 5th place
2007 – 
2009 – 
2013 – 
2015 – 5th place
2017 – 
2019 – 
2021 –

Hockey World League
2016–17 – Round 1

See also
Switzerland men's national field hockey team

References

Field hockey
European women's national field hockey teams
National team